Parupeneus cyclostomus, the gold-saddle goatfish, blue goatfish or yellowsaddle goatfish, is a species of goatfish native to the Indo-Pacific.  It is a commercially important species, as well as being sought out as a game fish, though it has been reported as carrying the ciguatera toxin.  It can also be found in the aquarium trade.

Description
This fish is usually colored yellow with a bluish sheen to the dorsal part, but with a golden yellow variant.  It can reach  in total length, though most do not exceed .

Habitat and distribution
It occurs solitarily or in groups, in all areas of the coral reefs and detrital bottom area from 1 to 95 m deep. It uses its barbels to probe holes and force out prey.

It is found in the Indo-Pacific from the Red Sea to South Africa, the Hawaiian Islands, and the Ryukyu Islands.

Synonyms
Several other names have been applied to this species that have been subsequently determined to be junior synonyms:
 Mullus cyclostomus Lacépède, 1801
 Pseudupeneus cyclostomus (Lacépède, 1801)
 Mullus chryserydros Lacépède, 1801
 Parupeneus chryserydros (Lacépède, 1801)
 Mullus radiatus G. Shaw, 1803
 Upeneus immaculatus E. T. Bennett, 1831
 Upeneus luteus Valenciennes, 1831
 Parupeneus luteus (Valenciennes, 1831)
 Upeneus oxycephalus Bleeker, 1856
 Upeneus chryserythrus Günther, 1873
 Parupeneus xanthospilurus Bleeker, 1875
 Mullus microps Bliss, 1883
 Upeneus saffordi Seale, 1901
 Pseudupeneus aurantiacus Seale, 1906

References

External links

cyclostomus
Marine fauna of East Africa
Fish of the Red Sea
Fish of Hawaii
Fish described in 1801